Gommen Valley is an ice-filled valley between Tunga Spur and Kuven Hill, near the southwest end of the Kirwan Escarpment in Queen Maud Land, Antarctica. It was mapped by Norwegian cartographers from surveys and air photos by the Norwegian–British–Swedish Antarctic Expedition (1949–52) and from additional air photos (1958–59), and named Gommen (the gum).

References

Valleys of Queen Maud Land
Princess Martha Coast